Charles Pittman may refer to:
 Charles Pittman (politician), Mississippi politician
 Charles Pittman (basketball) (born 1958), basketball player who played for the Phoenix Suns in the NBA
Charlie Pittman (born 1948), American football player

See also
Charles Pitman (disambiguation)